"Beer In Mexico" is a song written and recorded by American country music artist Kenny Chesney. It was released in January 2007 as the fifth and final single from his 2005 album The Road and the Radio.  The song reached number one on the U.S. Billboard Hot Country Songs chart. This was the first song written by Kenny Chesney himself to reach the top of that chart.

Background and writing
The liner notes for The Road and the Radio state that Chesney wrote the song while vacationing in Cabo San Lucas, Mexico for Sammy Hagar's birthday party.

Content
This song talks about a guy who is at the "crossroads in [his] life" and doesn't know what decisions to make, so he decides to relax and have a “beer in Mexico.”

Critical reception
Kevin John Coyne of Country Universe gave the song a B+ grade, saying that it "is a cool, loud record" and that "[t]here’s almost too much going on, but just almost" and concluding with "[how] radio will be all over the song". Dan Milliken of Country Universe rated the song number 108 on his list of the 201 Greatest Singles of the Decade. He stated that the song "was such a perfect encapsulation of Kenny Chesney’s musical identity from this decade that you could skip over the most of the rest of his work and still get the basic idea."

Chart positions
"Beer in Mexico" debuted at number 60 on the U.S. Billboard Hot Country Songs chart for the week of November 19, 2005 as an album cut. It re-entered Hot Country Songs at number 51 for the week of January 6, 2007.

Year-end charts

Certifications

References

2007 singles
2005 songs
Kenny Chesney songs
Songs written by Kenny Chesney
Songs about alcohol
Song recordings produced by Buddy Cannon
BNA Records singles